Adra railway division is one of the four railway divisions under South Eastern Railway zone of Indian Railways. This railway division was formed on 14 April 1961 and its headquarter is located at Adra town in Purulia district in the state of West Bengal of India. The Divisional Railway Managers building was established in the year of 1913 which has completed its 100 years in 2013. It was earlier the headquarter of Adra district in BNR.

Kharagpur railway division, Chakradharpur railway division and Ranchi railway division are the other three railway divisions under SER Zone headquartered at Garden Reach, Kolkata.

List of railway stations and towns 
The list includes the stations under the Adra railway division and their station category.

Stations closed for Passengers -

References

 
Divisions of Indian Railways
1952 establishments in West Bengal